Sherlock Holmes and the Mystery of Osborne House is an adventure video game for the Nintendo DS handheld game console by Frogwares. It is the first in the Sherlock Holmes series to be made specifically for the DS.

Gameplay
Sherlock Holmes and the Mystery of Osborne House places a heavy emphasis on puzzles, which the player solves using the stylus and touch screen. These largely take the form of minigames which include jigsaw puzzles, codes to  decipher and paintings to examine. Each of these puzzles has its own difficulty settings and styles of gameplay. The game also features a help system which highlights important clues and guides the player in completing the puzzles. Solving the puzzle without the use of the help system awards the player with extra points and unlocks extras material and bonus puzzles.

The game takes place in large hand drawn environments from the Victorian era London which players can roam and explore, taking on side quests and optional missions. When they interact with the various characters in the game, players can request information and interrogate them. When these characters give the player a clue, Holmes will sketch it, forming a new puzzle.

Plot
When Queen Victoria's genealogical records are stolen, the Royal Family decides to put Sherlock Holmes in charge of the case and asks him to solve the strange mystery. Followed by  Doctor Watson, Holmes use his senses of logic and observation through dozens of riddles, puzzles and brain teasers of all sorts. The investigation takes him to Windsor Castle, Buckingham Palace and the British Museum, and along the way he meets many charismatic characters who helps him solve the strange case and finally discover the truth, including the question of why the Royal Family insists on keeping the case a secret.

Reception

Sherlock Holmes and the Mystery of Osborne House received mixed to negative reviews from critics and user reviews. IGN gave it a poor score of 4.5. Adventure Gamers rated the game 2.5 stars out 5, heavily criticizing the short length of gameplay with uninspiring puzzles, an uninteresting plot, repetitive music and lack of hints. They did praise the quality of the graphics and the quizzes included.

References

External links

2010 video games
Focus Entertainment games
Adventure games
Detective video games
Nintendo DS games
Nintendo DS-only games
Mystery of Osborne House
THQ games
Mystery of Osborne House
Video games developed in Ukraine
Video games set in London
Video games set in the 19th century
Frogwares games
Single-player video games